Baitian Town is an urban town under the administration of Xiangxiang City, Xiangtan City, Hunan Province, People's Republic of China.

Administrative divisions
The town is divided into 34 villages and two districts: Fenbitan District, Fenlukou District, Dongsheng Village, Dahe Village, Baitian Village, Changjiang Village, Xinmiao Village, Xunshan Village, Qiaopu Village, Wuxing Village, Zhigong Village, Hehua Village, Dachong Village, Zili Village, Shanglu Village, Gaochong Village, Gaofeng Village, Xunfeng Village, Shangfu Village, Shijiang Village, Shimen Village, Renhou Village, Sanxin Village, Bantang Village, Zhongxing Village, Dongmao Village, Sanqian Village, Taofeng Village, Baishi Village, Jizhong Village, Yuzi Village, Chetian Village, Congxin Village, Xinghui Village, Shatian Village, and Banqiao Village.

References

External links

Divisions of Xiangxiang